Disneymania 4 is the fourth in the Disneymania series. This is the second Disneymania album with the Disney Channel Circle of Stars (though the album just calls them "Disney Channel Stars"), with a few additions, such as Dylan and Cole Sprouse,  from The Suite Life of Zack & Cody. Other artists include Jonas Brothers, Teddy Geiger, and B5. The album became the  second highest-peaking album in the series (behind Disneymania 5 which debuted and peaked at #14), peaking at #15 on the Billboard 200 and was certified Gold by the RIAA. To date, the album has sold over 717,000 copies, according to HITS Daily Double.

Track listing

1 Target Exclusive bonus track
2 Target Exclusive bonus track

Critical reception
Allmusic wrote "If you and your kids want to hear some of the most memorable songs from Disney films, both classic and contemporary, done up in a modern teen-pop style, try Disneymania 4. For instance, Cinderella never sounded so danceable as on the winsome Ashley Tisdale's club-friendly "Someday My Prince Will Come," and the rock redux of "Zip-A-Dee-Doo-Dah" by Miley Cyrus will inspire many a double take. For parents with fond memories of cinematic classics, or for tweens with a crush on Teddy Geiger or the Cheetah Girls, here's the disc to bridge the generation gap."

Charts

Singles
*NOTE: None of these songs were officially released as singles for the album, but as singles for the artists.

"A Dream Is a Wish Your Heart Makes" — Disney Channel Circle of Stars - released to promote Cinderella'' Platinum Edition
"Who's Afraid of the Big Bad Wolf" — B5
"If I Never Knew You" — The Cheetah Girls
"Super Cali (BoiOB Version)" — Orlando Brown

Music videos
"A Dream Is a Wish Your Heart Makes" — Disney Channel Circle of Stars
"If I Never Knew You" — The Cheetah Girls
"Who's Afraid of the Big Bad Wolf" — B5

References

External links
 Disneymania 4 Official site

Disneymania albums
Walt Disney Records compilation albums
2006 compilation albums